Continental Motors may refer to:

 Continental Motors Company, a defunct American automobile engine manufacturer, and briefly a complete automobile manufacturer
 Continental Aerospace Technologies, formerly Teledyne Continental Motors, spun off from Continental Motors to produce aircraft engines, still operating
 Continental Aviation and Engineering, spun off to produce larger aircraft engines over 500 hp, today known as Teledyne Turbine Engines and organized as a division of the aircraft engine company above